The 2013 season was the Kansas City Chiefs' 44th in the National Football League (NFL), their 54th overall and their first under the head coach/general manager tandem of Andy Reid and John Dorsey. After their 26–16 win over the Philadelphia Eagles in Week 3, which was also coach Andy Reid's first visit to Philadelphia since the Eagles fired him the season prior, the Chiefs vastly improved on their 2–14 record from 2012 just three weeks into the season. However, despite starting 9 - 0, the Chiefs would struggle in the second half of the season, losing 5 out of their last 7 games. Despite that, they would still make the playoffs. After defeating the New York Giants 31–7 in Week 4, the Chiefs became the first team in NFL history to win two or fewer games in the previous season, and win the first four games the next. On October 13, 2013 against the Oakland Raiders, Chiefs fans broke the Guinness World Record for loudest crowd roar at an outdoor stadium with 137.5 decibels. Seattle Seahawks fans later reclaimed the record on December 2, 2013, with a roar of 137.6 decibels. After the Indianapolis Colts defeated the Denver Broncos in Week 7, the Chiefs were the final undefeated team in the NFL. They were the first team in NFL history to earn the number one draft pick and be the last undefeated team in consecutive years.

The Chiefs clinched a playoff berth. They would lose to the Indianapolis Colts in the Wild Card round of the playoffs 45–44, after blowing a 38–10 second half lead. The loss extended an 8-game playoff losing streak dating back to the 1993 season, which stood as the longest in NFL history until it was broken by the Detroit Lions in 2016.

Roster changes

Trades

Cuts

Free agency

Draft

Undrafted free agents

Preseason cuts

*Tony Moeaki was originally released but was subsequently placed on injured reserve

Inseason Transactions

Cuts

Signings

Players with multiple transactions
This is a list of players who played for the Chiefs at some point during the season who were involved in more than one transaction during the season.

Staff

Final roster

Schedule

Preseason

Regular season

Note: Intra-division opponents are in bold text.

Postseason

Game summaries

Regular season

Week 1: at Jacksonville Jaguars

The Chiefs started their 2013 season on the road against the Jaguars. The Jags scored a safety when J. T. Thomas blocked a punt in the end zone, giving them a 2–0 lead. The Chiefs took the lead when Alex Smith found Donnie Avery on a 5-yard touchdown pass, making the score 7–2. This was followed up by Smith finding Junior Hemingway on a 3-yard pass, extending the Chiefs' lead to 14–2. In the second quarter, the Chiefs continued to dominate as Jamaal Charles ran for a 2-yard touchdown, giving the team a 21–2 halftime lead.

After a scoreless third quarter, the Chiefs scored the only points of the second half in the fourth quarter when Tamba Hali returned an interception 10 yards for a touchdown.

The Chiefs beat the Jacksonville Jaguars 28–2, the first time in NFL history a game ended with that score. It was also the second time in 20 years a team scored only two points during a regular season game, as well as being the most recent one as of 2021. The Jaguars crossed the 50-yard line once during the game but failed to score.

With the win, the Chiefs started 1–0.

Week 2: vs. Dallas Cowboys

The Chiefs made their regular season debut at home against the Cowboys. They scored first as Jamaal Charles caught a 2-yard touchdown pass from Alex Smith for a 7–0 lead. The Cowboys got on the scoreboard when Dan Bailey kicked a 51-yard field goal to make the score 7–3, followed by Tony Romo and Dez Bryant hooking up on a 2-yard pass to give the Cowboys a 10–7 lead. With the 2nd quarter being scoreless, the Cowboys held on to their lead through halftime.

In the 3rd quarter, Bailey nailed a 30-yard field goal to increase the Cowboys' lead to 13–7. However, the Chiefs retook the lead when Smith found Dwayne Bowe on a 12-yard pass, making the score 14–13. In the 4th quarter, the Chiefs increased their lead to 17–13 when Ryan Succop nailed a 40-yard field goal. The Cowboys tried to rally late, but came up a point short when the only score they could muster was a 53-yard field goal by Bailey. The Chiefs won the game 17–16, earning their first 2–0 start since 2010.

Week 3: at Philadelphia Eagles

After a close call win at home, the Chiefs traveled to Philadelphia to take on the Eagles in a TNF duel. The Chiefs started their scoring when Ryan Succop kicked a 33-yard field goal for a 3–0 lead. This was followed by Eric Berry returning an interception 38 yards for a touchdown for a 10–0 lead. The Eagles managed to get on the board later on in the quarter when Michael Vick found Jason Avant on a 22-yard touchdown pass (with a failed PAT) making the score 10–6. The Chiefs continued to dominate as Succop kicked 2 field goals increasing his teams lead from 7 to eventually 10 points with field goals from 31 and 34 yards out 13–6 and 16–6 at halftime. In the 3rd quarter, the Eagles managed to rally coming within 7 points as Alex Henery kicked a 29-yard field goal for the only score of the quarter. The Chiefs pulled away as Jamaal Charles ran for a 3-yard touchdown for a 23–9 lead. The Eagles then fired back as LeSean McCoy ran for a touchdown from 41-yards out once again coming within 7 23–16. With Succop's 38-yard field goal, the Chiefs were able to seal the game with a final score of 26–16 sending them to a 3–0 start, their first such start since 2010. This was also head coach Andy Reid’s first visit to Philadelphia since he was fired by the organization a season earlier. Reid served as the Eagles head coach from 1999–2012.

Week 4: vs. New York Giants

After a win over the Eagles, the Chiefs returned home for a game against the Giants. After a scoreless first quarter, they got on the board as Alex Smith found Sean McGrath on a 5-yard pass for a 7–0 lead. The Giants managed to tie the game up as Eli Manning found Victor Cruz on a 69-yard pass making the score 7–7. Ryan Succop then kicked a 51-yard field goal to send the Chiefs to a 10–7 halftime lead.

In the second half, the Chiefs dominated as Dexter McCluster ran a punt back 89 yards for a touchdown increasing their lead to 17–7 for the only score of the third quarter. In the fourth quarter, Alex Smith threw two more touchdown passes to Jamaal Charles and Dwayne Bowe from 2 and 34 yards out that eventually sealed the game for them, moving them up 24–7 before the final score sat at 31–7.

The win sent the Chiefs to their first 4–0 start since 2003.

Week 5: at Tennessee Titans

Kansas City jumped to 13–0 lead but by end of the third quarter, the Chiefs were trailing 17–13. But the Chiefs answered by scoring 13 unanswered points in the 4th quarter and won the game 26–17.

With the win, the team improved to 5–0, their first such start since 2003.

Week 6: vs. Oakland Raiders

The Chiefs improved to 6–0 after defeating the Oakland Raiders 24–7, and snapped a six-game home losing streak to the Oakland Raiders dating back to the 2007 season. It was at this game that Arrowhead Stadium fans set a new Guinness World Record for loudest outdoor stadium in any sport.

It also featured the largest flyover with 42 planes.

Week 7: vs. Houston Texans

With the win, the Chiefs improved to 7–0, the first time they had begun a season with such a record since 2003. With the Broncos' loss to the Colts, they became the league's only undefeated team while they also became leader of the AFC West.

Week 8: vs. Cleveland Browns

With the win, the Chiefs improved to 8–0 for the first time since 2003.

Week 9: at Buffalo Bills

With the win, the Chiefs went 9–0 heading into their bye week. It also gave them their first winning season since 2010 and first 9–0 start since 2003.

Week 11: at Denver Broncos

Against the Broncos in a battle of the 9–0 Chiefs and 8–1 Broncos, Denver wound up beating the Chiefs 27–17, handing the Chiefs their first loss. With the loss, the Chiefs fell to 9–1.

Week 12: vs. San Diego Chargers

San Diego triumphed in the highest-scoring matchup with Kansas City since a 42–41 loss in 1986. The game lead changed eight times as Alex Smith threw for 294 yards and three touchdowns, but Rivers (392 yards) won it in the final seconds on a 26-yard score to Seyi Ajirotutu. The loss was Kansas City's second straight after the Chiefs' nine-game winning streak.

Week 13: vs. Denver Broncos

Kansas City led 21–7 at one point, but the Broncos came back to win 35–28 and sweep the Chiefs for the second straight season. With their third straight loss, the Chiefs fell to 9–3. They were the first 9–0 team in NFL history to lose three straight games following a 9–0 start.

Week 14: at Washington Redskins

The Chiefs finally found their winning ways again, as they beat the Redskins 45–10 and led 38–10 at halftime. With the win, the Chiefs improved to 10–3.

Week 15: at Oakland Raiders

Jamaal Charles scored five touchdowns for the Chiefs as they won 56–31 at Oakland. With the win, the Chiefs improved to 11–3.

Week 16: vs. Indianapolis Colts

In a preview of the Wild Card game between these two teams, the Chiefs lost to Indianapolis 23–7 despite leading 7–0 at one point. With the loss, the Chiefs fell to 11–4.

Week 17: at San Diego Chargers

With no Alex Smith playing due to Kansas City resting their starters for the playoffs, it was up to Chase Daniel to guide the Chiefs. Kansas City missed a field goal at the end of regulation. The Chargers won in overtime on a field goal. With the loss, the Chiefs finished the regular season 11–5 and finished 2–4 against their division and 9–1 against the rest of the NFL.

Postseason

AFC Wild Card Playoff Game: at (4) Indianapolis Colts

Standings

Division

Conference

References

External links
 

Kansas City
Kansas City Chiefs seasons
2013 in sports in Missouri